Bourne is a town in Barnstable County, Massachusetts, United States. The population was 20,452 at the 2020 census.

For geographic and demographic information on specific parts of the town of Bourne, please see the articles on Bourne (CDP), Buzzards Bay, Monument Beach, Pocasset, Sagamore, and Sagamore Beach.

History
Bourne was first settled in 1640 by Ezra Perry as a part of the town of Sandwich. Prior to its separation from Sandwich, the area was referred to as West Sandwich. It was officially incorporated in 1884, the last town to be incorporated in Barnstable County. It was named for Jonathan Bourne Sr. (1811–1889), whose ancestor Richard Bourne represented Sandwich in the first Massachusetts General Court and was the first preacher to the Mashpee Wampanoag on Cape Cod. The town lies at the northeast corner of Buzzards Bay and is the site of Aptucxet Trading Post, the nation's oldest store. It was founded by the Pilgrims in 1627 at a site halfway between the two rivers which divided Cape Cod from the rest of the state. It was out of this location that the Cape Cod Canal was formed, in order to save time and lives by eliminating the need to sail around the hazardous eastern shores of the Cape. Because of the canal, Bourne is now considered the "first" town on the Cape, as all three bridges (the Bourne, Sagamore and the Cape Cod Canal Railroad Bridge) are located within the town. Most of Bourne is on Cape Cod, Buzzards Bay and Sagamore Beach being the villages that are on the mainland side with Buttermilk bay forming the western edge of the peninsula (cape) and the Bourndale Road forming the northern boundary to the cape.

Bourne is the site of the Massachusetts Maritime Academy, a maritime college located at the southern mouth of the canal on the western shore.

Otis Air National Guard Base is partially located in the town. The Air Force Space Command system PAVE PAWS northeast radar is located within Bourne's borders inside Otis Air National Guard Base.

Bourne is home to an archaeological curiosity known as the "Bourne stone", featuring markings whose origin and significance have not been conclusively established.

President Grover Cleveland owned a summer estate in Bourne Village, Gray Gables, that served as the Summer White House from 1893 to 1896. The building was destroyed in a fire in 1973.

Geography

Bourne is located at the western end of Cape Cod, with the Cape Cod Canal cutting across the northern portion of the town. It is bordered by Sandwich to the east, Falmouth to the south, Marion and Wareham to the west, and Plymouth and Cape Cod Bay to the north. The border with Plymouth and Wareham in Plymouth County constitutes the only landed border between Barnstable County and any other county (the borders with Dukes and Nantucket counties lie in Nantucket Sound). Major localities of Bourne include Bournedale and Buzzards Bay on the west side of the Cape Cod Canal, Sagamore, which straddles the canal, and Bourne village, Monument Beach, Pocasset, and Cataumet on the east side of the canal.

Bourne's geography was formed around its location on Buzzards Bay and the Cape Cod Canal. There are several necks (the local term for a peninsula), including Wings Neck and Scraggy Neck, and islands along the shore, which create several small coves and harbors. There are also several small ponds and rivers, all of which (except the Herring River, which feeds directly into the Canal) feed into Buzzards Bay. The largest of these inlets, Buttermilk Bay, lies along the border with Wareham. Because of the large parcel of land occupied by Otis A.N.G.B. in the eastern part of the town, the majority of settlement is either along the shores of the Canal or along Buzzards Bay. There is also a small neighborhood (South Sagamore) located between the Canal and the northern boundaries of the base. Bourne has a town forest and a small portion of the Shawme-Crowell State Forest, which is located along Otis's northern boundary. There are also many beaches along its shores, mostly along Buzzards Bay (although Sagamore Beach lies along Cape Cod Bay).

Climate
According to the Köppen climate classification system, Bourne, Massachusetts has a warm-summer, wet all year, humid continental climate (Dfb). Dfb climates are characterized by at least one month having an average mean temperature ≤ 32.0 °F (≤ 0.0 °C), at least four months with an average mean temperature ≥ 50.0 °F (≥ 10.0 °C), all months with an average mean temperature ≤ 71.6 °F (≤ 22.0 °C), and no significant precipitation difference between seasons. The average seasonal (Nov-Apr) snowfall total is around 30 in (76 cm). The average snowiest month is February which corresponds with the annual peak in nor'easter activity. According to the United States Department of Agriculture, the plant hardiness zone is 6b with an average annual extreme minimum temperature of −1.0 °F (−18.3 °C).

Ecology

According to the A. W. Kuchler U.S. Potential natural vegetation Types, Bourne, Massachusetts would primarily contain a Northeastern Oak/Pine (110) vegetation type with a Southern Mixed Forest (26) vegetation form.

Demographics

As of the census of 2000, there were 18,721 people, 7,439 households, and 5,013 families residing in the town. The racial makeup of the town was 97.72% White, 0.39% Black or African American, 0.53% Native American, 0.71% Asian, 0.01% Pacific Islander, 0.99% from other races, and 0.65% from two or more races. Hispanic or Latino of any race were 0.46% of the population.

There were 7,439 households, out of which 28.2% had children under the age of 18 living with them, 77.6% were married couples living together, 5.4% had a female householder with no husband present, and 22.6% were non-families. 26.8% of all households were made up of individuals, and 11.8% had someone living alone who was 65 years of age or older. The average household size was 2.39 and the average family size was 2.90.

In the town, the population was spread out, with 21.9% under the age of 18, 9.4% from 18 to 24, 27.3% from 25 to 44, 23.8% from 45 to 64, and 17.6% who were 65 years of age or older. The median age was 39 years. For every 100 females, there were 97.1 males. For every 100 females age 18 and over, there were 95.9 males.

The median income for a household in the town was $92,216, and the median income for a family was $118,321. The per capita income for the town was $64,012.

Government

Bourne is represented in the Massachusetts House of Representatives as a part of three separate districts, the Second Plymouth, Fifth Barnstable, and a third district which includes portions of Falmouth and Mashpee. The town is represented in the Massachusetts Senate as a part of the Plymouth and Barnstable district, which includes Falmouth, Kingston, Pembroke, Plymouth, Plympton, Sandwich, and portions of Barnstable. The town is home to the Seventh Barracks of Troop D of the Massachusetts State Police.

On the national level, Bourne is a part of Massachusetts's 9th congressional district, and is currently represented by Bill Keating. The state's senior (Class I) member of the United States Senate, elected in 2012, is Elizabeth Warren. The junior (Class II) senator, Edward Markey, was elected in 2013.

The town uses the open town meeting form of government, which is led by a board of selectmen. Members of the Board of Selectmen are Peter J Meier – Chair , Jared MacDonald  – Vice Chair, Melissa A Ferretti – Clerk, Judith McLeod Froman and  Mary Jane Mastrangelo. The town hall, like the police station, lies on the mainland side of the Canal. There are four fire stations located throughout the town, and seven post offices for the town's eight ZIP codes. The town's Jonathan Bourne Public Library is located near the Aptucxet Trading Post, just south of the Bourne Bridge, and is a member of the Cape Libraries Automated Materials Sharing (CLAMS) library network.

Education
Bourne operates its own school department, with four public schools in the town. There are two elementary schools, Bourne Intermediate School, and Bournedale Elementary School. Bournedale serve grades kindergarten through second, Bourne Intermediate School Serves grades three through five. The town's middle school serves grades sixth through eight, and Bourne High School operates grades nine through twelve. The school's colors are purple and white, and their teams are the Canalmen and Lady Canalmen. Their logo includes the Railroad Bridge, one of the three bridges crossing the Cape Cod Canal, and the only one that looks different from the other two. Bourne's chief rival is Wareham High School.

In the fall of 2009 Bournedale Elementary School opened, closing Otis Memorial Elementary and Ella F. Hoxie School.

Bourne High School's sports teams have been very successful in the recent past, including state championships in boys' hockey and girls' volleyball. State finalists include girls' volleyball, golf, and boys' soccer. Conference championships have been won by boys' tennis, soccer, and football. The baseball team recently performed very well in the 2007 MIAA State Tournament, losing to Cape-rival Harwich in the South Finals. Bourne also perennially has a moderately successful ice hockey program.

Additionally, Bourne is home to the Upper Cape Cod Regional Technical School, located off Sandwich Road. The school serves Bourne, Falmouth and Sandwich on the Cape, as well as Wareham and Marion (off Cape). The town also has a private school: The Bridgeview School in Sagamore, a private Montessori school serving Pre-K through 6th grades. It formerly had the Waldorf School of Cape Cod, which was a Waldorf school located just south of the Bourne Bridge, serving grades Pre-K through 8. It since has moved to Cotuit, followed by a move to Sandwich, where it serves a smaller range of students.

Area Catholic schools of the Roman Catholic Diocese of Fall River include: St. Francis Xavier School in Acushnet, St. Joseph School in Fairhaven, and St. Pius X School in South Yarmouth. Previously Buzzards Bay had its own Catholic grade school, St. Margaret Primary School, which closed in 2020 in the wake of the COVID-19 pandemic. St. Francis Xavier, St. Joseph, and St. Pius X took former St. Margaret students.

The Massachusetts Maritime Academy, a state maritime college, is also located in Buzzards Bay at the western mouth of the Cape Cod Canal.

Sports

Bourne is home to the Bourne Braves, an amateur collegiate summer baseball team in the Cape Cod Baseball League. The team plays at Doran Park, and has featured dozens of players who went on to careers in Major League Baseball, such as Kevin Youkilis, Mitch Moreland, and Pete Alonso.

A New England Football League team, the South Shore Outlaws were formerly located in Bourne.

Transportation

Roadways
The largest highways in Bourne are Massachusetts Route 3, U.S. Route 6, Massachusetts Route 25 and Massachusetts Route 28. Routes 6 and 28 enter the town concurrently from Wareham, bypassing Buzzards Bay to the north. At the Buzzards Bay Rotary the two routes split. Route 6 goes straight ahead and assumes its old alignment as a four-lane highway along the north side of the Cape Cod Canal, going through the village of Bournedale before becoming the Mid-Cape Highway, a four-lane limited-access highway beginning at the western approach to the Sagamore Bridge. Sandwich Road, the road parallel to Route 6 running along the south side of the canal, was formerly signed as Route 6W. Currently it is an unsigned two-lane state highway that is used as an alternate to Route 6. Sandwich Road becomes Massachusetts Route 6A east of the intersection with Cranberry Highway, a road that acts as a connector between Route 6A and Route 6 eastbound prior to the approach of the Sagamore Bridge. Route 28 splits off at the Buzzards Bay Rotary as a ramp headed to the Bourne Bridge and Route 25. Route 25's terminus is just prior to the northern approach of the Bourne Bridge where the highway continues as Route 28 south. At the southern end of the bridge is the Bourne Rotary, where Sandwich Road intersects. Route 28 continues past the rotary as a four-lane divided highway, officially known as McArthur Boulevard. At the Otis Rotary, the intersection with the road leading to the main gate to Otis Air Force Base, Route 28A spurs off and heads towards Woods Hole in Falmouth. It is at this point that the highway goes from being a surface road to a true limited-access highway. Route 3, also known as the Pilgrims Highway, ends at the junction of Route 6, just prior to the Sagamore Bridge. Up until 2006, the intersection was a rotary, which caused daily traffic nightmares during the busy summer tourist season. The rotary was removed in 2007.

Rail
The third bridge over the Canal is the Cape Cod Canal Railroad Bridge, a vertical lift bridge. Freight rail service is provided by the Massachusetts Coastal Railroad. The town is part of the MBTA district and is directly served by the seasonal CapeFlyer at Buzzards Bay station and Bourne station. The closest MBTA Commuter Rail stations are Middleborough/Lakeville and Kingston/Route 3, which provide direct service to Boston. The nearest inter-city (Amtrak) passenger rail stations are Boston's South Station and Providence. The Cape Cod Central Railroad operates seasonal tourist excursions from Hyannis to Sagamore, with occasional special excursions to Buzzards Bay village.

Air
There are no public air facilities in town; the town is roughly equidistant between the Plymouth and Barnstable municipal airports. The nearest national and international airports are Logan International Airport in Boston and T. F. Green Airport outside Providence.

Notable people

 Sammy Adams, rapper, singer and songwriter
 Bill Arnold, NHL player
 Mark Fayne, NHL player
 Peter Gammons, sportswriter
 Bill Keating, member of the U.S. House of Representatives
 Bobby Orr, former NHL player
 T. K. O'Ryan, professional wrestler
 Bob Perryman, football player
 Dan Shaughnessy, sportswriter
 Mike Stud, hip-hop recording artist

See also
 Avery Hill, a geographical feature in Bourne.
National Marine Life Center

References

External links

Town of Bourne official website
Bourne Youth Football and Cheerleading

 
1640 establishments in Massachusetts
Populated coastal places in Massachusetts
Populated places established in 1640
Towns in Barnstable County, Massachusetts
Towns in Massachusetts